The men's 1500 metre freestyle event at the 2008 Olympic Games took place on 15 and 17 August at the Beijing National Aquatics Center in Beijing, China.

Competing at his third Games, Oussama Mellouli made an Olympic milestone to become Tunisia's first ever gold medalist in 48 years. He denied Australia's Grant Hackett a third straight title in the event, touching the wall first in an African record of 14:40.84. Hanging with the leaders through the first two-thirds of the race, Mellouli moved into the lead at the 1,100-metre mark, and held off Hackett's sprinted finish on the final lap. This was also a retribution for Mellouli, who served an 18-month doping ban from FINA for using the banned stimulant Adderall.

Trying to become the first male swimmer to win three gold medals in the same event, Hackett collected a silver in 14:41.53. Meanwhile, Canada's Ryan Cochrane powered home with a bronze in 14:42.69, finishing ahead of Russia's Yuri Prilukov (14:43.21). U.S. swimmer Larsen Jensen, silver medalist in Athens four years earlier, placed fifth with a time 14:48.16, and was followed in the sixth spot by Great Britain's David Davies in 14:52.11. Chinese duo Zhang Lin (14:55.20) and Sun Yang (15:05.12) rounded out the finale.

Earlier in the prelims, Cochrane established a new Olympic record of 14:40.84 in heat three, until Hackett cleared the 14:40 barrier, and lowered the record to 14:38.92 in the final heat of five.

Records

Prior to this competition, the existing world and Olympic records were as follows.

The following new Olympic records were set during this competition.

Results

Heats

Final

References

External links
Official Olympic Report

Men's freestyle 1500 metre
Men's events at the 2008 Summer Olympics